A Sort of Family is a 2017 internationally co-produced drama film directed by Diego Lerman. It was screened in the Contemporary World Cinema section at the 42nd Toronto International Film Festival on 8 September 2017.

Cast
 Bárbara Lennie as Malena
 Daniel Aráoz as Dr. Costas
 Claudio Tolcachir as Mariano
 Yanina Ávila as Marcela
 Paula Cohen as Dra. Pernía

References

External links
 

2017 films
2017 drama films
Argentine drama films
2010s Spanish-language films
2010s Argentine films